Disk cloning software facilitates a disk cloning operation by using software techniques to copy data from a source to a destination drive or to a disk image. .

List

See also

Concepts 
 Disk image
 Disk cloning
 Backup

Lists 
List of backup software
List of data recovery software
List of disk partitioning software

Comparison 
Comparison of disc image software

References

Disk cloning software